Anthony John "Sully" Sullivan (born 11 February 1969), also known as The OxiClean Man, is an English producer and pitchman of media shopping in the United States, best known for his work in television commercials. He is the founder and CEO of Sullivan Productions, Inc. which produces commercial spots for brands such as OxiClean, Nutrisystem, and Arm & Hammer.

Early life and career
Sullivan was born on 11 February 1969 in Devon, England. In the early 1990s, he moved to the United States and teamed up with a manufacturing company to create the "Smart Mop". A few years later, he debuted it on Home Shopping Network (HSN), where he met his future business partner and friend Billy Mays. In the mid-1990s, HSN hired Sullivan as a network show host. In 1998, he left HSN and formed Sullivan Productions in Tampa, Florida.

PitchMen
Sullivan starred in a Discovery Channel reality series, PitchMen. In the first season, he co-starred alongside Billy Mays. Following Mays' death in 2009, Sullivan became the sole star in season two (as well as a spokesperson for OxiClean line of products from Church & Dwight). The show follows how new products are selected by the firm in association with DRTV company Telebrands and its CEO, A. J. Khubani, the products' origins and their inventors, and the production of the advertising.

Sullivan and Mays appeared on the 23 June 2009 episode of The Tonight Show with Conan O'Brien, which aired five days before Mays' death.

References

External links
 Anthony Sullivan official website

1969 births
English television personalities
English emigrants to the United States
Living people
Businesspeople from Devon
Salespeople
Infomercials